Salem Yahya Alkharejah is a Yemeni diplomat. He quit his position as an Ambassador to the Czech Republic over the 2011 Yemeni uprising.

References

Yemeni diplomats
Ambassadors of Yemen to the Czech Republic
Living people
Year of birth missing (living people)
Place of birth missing (living people)
21st-century Yemeni people